Vitta piratica is a species of sea snail, a marine gastropod mollusk in the family Neritidae.

Description

Distribution
The holotype of this species was found in the Wounta Lagoon, Nicaragua.

References

 Russell H. D. 1940. Some new Neritidae from the West Indies. Memorias de la Sociedad Cubana de Historia Natural “Felipe Poey”, 14(4): 257–262, pl. 46.
 Eichhorst T.E. (2016). Neritidae of the world. Volume 2. Harxheim: Conchbooks. pp. 696–1366.

Neritidae
Gastropods described in 1940